These hits topped the Ultratop 50 in the Flanders region of Belgium in 1982.

See also
1982 in music

References

1982 in Belgium
1982 record charts
1982